Nymphicula patnalis is a moth in the family Crambidae. It was described by Cajetan Felder, Rudolf Felder and Alois Friedrich Rogenhofer in 1875. It is found in India.

References

Nymphicula
Moths described in 1875